In computing, decimal64 is a decimal floating-point computer numbering format that occupies 8 bytes (64 bits) in computer memory.
It is intended for applications where it is necessary to emulate decimal rounding exactly, such as financial and tax computations.

Zero has 768 possible representations (1536 if both signed zeros are included).

Decimal64 floating point is a relatively new decimal floating-point format, formally introduced in the 2008 version of IEEE 754 as well as with ISO/IEC/IEEE 60559:2011.

Representation of decimal64 values 

IEEE 754 allows two alternative representation methods for decimal64 values. The standard does not specify how to signify which representation is used, for instance in a situation where decimal64 values are communicated between systems:

 In the binary representation method, the 16-digit significand is represented as a binary coded positive integer, based on binary integer decimal (BID).
 In the decimal representation method, the 16-digit significand is represented as a decimal coded positive integer, based on densely packed decimal (DPD) with 5 groups of 3 digits (except the most significant digit encoded specially) are each represented in declets (10-bit sequences). This is pretty efficient, because 210 = 1024, is only little more than needed to still contain all numbers from 0 to 999.

Both alternatives provide exactly the same range of representable numbers: 16 digits of significand and  possible decimal exponent values. (All the possible decimal exponent values storable in a binary64 number are representable in decimal64, and most bits of the significand of a binary64 are stored keeping roughly the same number of decimal digits in the significand.)

In both cases, the most significant 4 bits of the significand (which actually only have 10 possible values) are combined with the most significant 2 bits of the exponent (3 possible values) to use 30 of the 32 possible values of a 5-bit field. The remaining combinations encode infinities and NaNs.

In the cases of Infinity and NaN, all other bits of the encoding are ignored.  Thus, it is possible to initialize an array to Infinities or NaNs by filling it with a single byte value.

Binary integer significand field 
This format uses a binary significand from 0 to 

As described above, the encoding varies depending on whether the most significant  of the significand are in the range 0 to 7 (00002 to 01112), or higher (10002 or 10012).

If the 2 after the sign bit are "00", "01", or "10", then the  exponent field consists of the  following the sign bit, and the significand is the remaining , with an implicit leading :

 s 00eeeeeeee   (0)ttt tttttttttt tttttttttt tttttttttt tttttttttt tttttttttt
 s 01eeeeeeee   (0)ttt tttttttttt tttttttttt tttttttttt tttttttttt tttttttttt
 s 10eeeeeeee   (0)ttt tttttttttt tttttttttt tttttttttt tttttttttt tttttttttt
 
This includes subnormal numbers where the leading significand digit is 0.

If the  after the sign bit are "11", then the 10-bit exponent field is shifted  to the right (after both the sign bit and the "11" bits thereafter), and the represented significand is in the remaining . In this case there is an implicit (that is, not stored) leading 3-bit sequence "100" for the most bits of the true significand (in the remaining lower bits ttt...ttt of the significand, not all possible values are used).

 s 1100eeeeeeee (100)t tttttttttt tttttttttt tttttttttt tttttttttt tttttttttt
 s 1101eeeeeeee (100)t tttttttttt tttttttttt tttttttttt tttttttttt tttttttttt
 s 1110eeeeeeee (100)t tttttttttt tttttttttt tttttttttt tttttttttt tttttttttt

The 2-bit sequence "11" after the sign bit indicates that there is an implicit 3-bit prefix "100" to the significand. Compare having an implicit 1-bit prefix "1" in the significand of normal values for the binary formats. The 2-bit sequences "00", "01", or "10" after the sign bit are part of the exponent field.

The leading bits of the significand field do not encode the most significant decimal digit; they are simply part of a larger pure-binary number.
2 (with the 3 most significant bits (100) not stored but implicit as shown above; and the next bit is always zero in valid encodings).

In the above cases, the value represented is

   

If the four bits after the sign bit are "1111" then the value is an infinity or a NaN, as described above:

 s 11110 xx...x    ±infinity
 s 11111 0x...x    a quiet NaN
 s 11111 1x...x    a signalling NaN

Densely packed decimal significand field 
In this version, the significand is stored as a series of decimal digits.  The leading digit is between 0 and 9 (3 or 4 binary bits), and the rest of the significand uses the densely packed decimal (DPD) encoding.

The leading  of the exponent and the leading digit (3 or ) of the significand are combined into the five bits that follow the sign bit.

This eight bits after that are the exponent continuation field, providing the less-significant bits of the exponent.

The last  are the significand continuation field, consisting of five 10-bit declets. Each declet encodes three decimal digits using the DPD encoding.

If the first two bits after the sign bit are "00", "01", or "10", then those are the leading bits of the exponent, and the three bits "TTT" after that are interpreted as the leading decimal digit (0 to 7):

 s 00 TTT (00)eeeeeeee (0TTT)[tttttttttt][tttttttttt][tttttttttt][tttttttttt][tttttttttt]
 s 01 TTT (01)eeeeeeee (0TTT)[tttttttttt][tttttttttt][tttttttttt][tttttttttt][tttttttttt]
 s 10 TTT (10)eeeeeeee (0TTT)[tttttttttt][tttttttttt][tttttttttt][tttttttttt][tttttttttt]

If the first two bits after the sign bit are "11", then the second 2-bits are the leading bits of the exponent, and the next bit "T" is prefixed with implicit bits "100" to form the leading decimal digit (8 or 9):

 s 1100 T (00)eeeeeeee (100T)[tttttttttt][tttttttttt][tttttttttt][tttttttttt][tttttttttt]
 s 1101 T (01)eeeeeeee (100T)[tttttttttt][tttttttttt][tttttttttt][tttttttttt][tttttttttt]
 s 1110 T (10)eeeeeeee (100T)[tttttttttt][tttttttttt][tttttttttt][tttttttttt][tttttttttt]

The remaining two combinations (11 110 and 11 111) of the 5-bit field after the sign bit are used to represent ±infinity and NaNs, respectively.

The DPD/3BCD transcoding for the declets is given by the following table. b9...b0 are the bits of the DPD, and d2...d0 are the three BCD digits.

The 8 decimal values whose digits are all 8s or 9s have four codings each.
The bits marked x in the table above are ignored on input, but will always be 0 in computed results.
(The  non-standard encodings fill in the gap between )

In the above cases, with the true significand as the sequence of decimal digits decoded, the value represented is

See also 
 ISO/IEC 10967, Language Independent Arithmetic
 Primitive data type
 D notation (scientific notation)

References 

Computer arithmetic
Data types
Floating point types